Scribe is a hardcore/experimental/post-hardcore/metal band from Mumbai, India. Active since 2005, the band has built up a reputation for itself as one of the most technical bands on the Indian underground metal scene.

Scribe performed at Saarang 2012, the annual cultural festival of Indian Institute of Technology Madras, on the 21st of January 2012, BITotsav 2012, the annual cultural festival of Birla Institute of Technology, Mesra and Synapse 2011, the annual techno-cultural festival of Dhirubhai Ambani Institute of Information and Communication Technology, on 27 February 2011.

History 
The original 2009 line-up consisted of Prashant Shah (Exhumation) on guitars, Niraj (Pin Drop Violence, Chaos Theory), Srinivas Sunderrajan (Chaos Theory), and Vishwesh Krishnamoorthy (Split). This line-up released its first EP, Have Hard, Will Core, on Demonstealer Records, creating waves among Indian metal fans and helping to build the band's fanbase. Soon after this, Akshay (Skincold) joined the band to add to the eclectic soundscape.

A video released for the song "One Wing Pencil" from the EP generated publicity for the band which earned it a place on the Segarams Great Indian Rock Tour, opening for Freak Kitchen, Sahg and Satyricon. It also played shows at ESP Explosion and Independence Rock, winning the nationwide tour and competitions 2007 title. The band continued to play shows in cities like Delhi, Shillong, Guwahati, Pune and Bangalore well into 2008.

The band's first album, Confect, was released independently in 2008. The band had decided not to commercialize the album due to lack of money and prowess to reach the masses and distributed the album free of cost to audience members at shows, and is available for digital download via the band's web page. Confect was placed fifth on Rolling Stone magazine's list of Top Ten Indian Albums in 2008. A similar list by RockStreet placed the album second. This was followed by a video for the song "Analyze That". The band continues to play the Indian metal circuit with appearances at events like MySpace Secret Shows.

The album Mark of Teja (2010) was named the Best Metal Album at various award ceremonies.

In 2010, Scribe played at the Inferno Festival in Norway.

In 2014 they came out with their third full-length studio album Hail Mogambo.

Style and lyrical themes 
The band's music is characterized by fast tempos and heavily distorted guitars. The riffs are generally compact and confined within a single octave, and are augmented by downtuned seven string guitars. The band favours a wet distortion sound, which is generally backed by a synchronized bass line. The drumming relies heavily on double bassing, with the snares and cymbals following a standard 4/4 pattern. Certain songs are melody based, although the melody lines are usually interspersed between fast sections.

Influences 
The band is influenced by various bands from a variety of genres though primarily hardcore bands like Sick of It All, Raised Fist, The Dillinger Escape Plan and Poison the Well. The band is also influenced by Sikth and Textures, It is known to play covers at some of live shows like "Voodoo People" (The Prodigy), "Nobody Takes Pictures of the Drummer" (Nora), "Setting Fire to Sleeping Giants" (The Dillinger Escape Plan), "Condemned Until Rebirth" (Hatebreed), "Take the Night Off" (Sick of It All), "Slither" (Earth Crisis), "Playing Soldier Again" (Walls of Jericho) and a cover of Del Amitri's "Roll to Me" on Confect.

Discography 
Have Hard Will Core (2006)
Confect (2008)
Mark of Teja (2010)
 Hail Mogambo (2014)

Compilations 
Absolute Indian Metal (2006)
Great Indian Rock XI (2007)

Line up

Current
 Prashant Shah - guitars
 Akshay Rajpurohit - guitars
 Srinivas 'Vaas' Sunderrajan - bass
 Virendra G. Kaith - drums
 Vishwesh Krishnamoorthy - Vocals

Former
 Siddharth Basrur (ex- Goddess Gagged)
 Viraaj Saxena 
 Niraj Haresh Trivedi(ex- Pin Drop Violence)

See also
Indian rock
Skyharbor
Bhayanak Maut

References

External links 

 
 Scribe on Facebook
 
 website of Demonstealer Records

Death metal musical groups
Indian hardcore punk groups
Indian heavy metal musical groups
Musical groups established in 2005